Aulacus burquei is a species of parasitoid wasp in the family Aulacidae. It is found in North America.It's only known host is Xiphydria. A. burquei lays its egg within the eggs of its host.

References

Further reading

 

Parasitic wasps
Articles created by Qbugbot
Insects described in 1882
Evanioidea